Dragon Wharf or Ho Chi Minh Museum is the original commercial port of Saigon. It is located on the Saigon River. Construction began in 1862 and more than a year later, in 1863, the house was completed. It is located at the junction of the Saigon River in District 4.

On 5 June 1911, Ho Chi Minh (at the time named Nguyen Tat Thanh) departed from the Dragon Wharf on the French ship Amiral de Latouche-Tréville for a 30-year journey around the world. Therefore, in 1979, the old headquarters building of the commercial port has been rebuilt into a memorial park in Ho Chi Minh City.

During the Vietnam War the building was used by the United States Military Sea Transportation Service.

References

External links

 Homepage 
 English information

Museums in Ho Chi Minh City
History of Ho Chi Minh City